Jimmy Chin (born ) is an American professional mountain athlete, photographer, film director, and author.  

Chin has been a professional climber and skier on The North Face Athlete team for over 20 years. In 2006, Chin achieved the first successful American ski descent from the summit of Mount Everest with Kit and Rob DesLauriers. Five years later, Chin, Conrad Anker, and Renan Ozturk captured the first ascent of "Shark's Fin", a granite wall on India's Meru Peak.

Chin's work documenting expeditions and climbs has been featured in numerous publications, including National Geographic, The New York Times Magazine, Vanity Fair, Outside magazine and others. In 2019, Chin was awarded the National Geographic "Photographer's Photographer Award" by his peers. His first book of photography documenting his career in the mountains, There and Back, became a New York Times Best Seller in 2021.  

Chin co-directs with his wife Elizabeth Chai Vasarhelyi. Together they directed the documentary Meru, which won numerous awards including the Audience Award at the Sundance Film Festival and was shortlisted for an Academy Award, and Free Solo, which won an Academy Award for Best Documentary Feature, a BAFTA and seven Primetime Emmys. Free Solo had the highest-grossing opening weekend in history for a documentary. The film eventually grossed $29 million dollars in the box office. Chin and Chai's 2021 documentary, The Rescue, chronicles the Tham Luang cave rescue. The Rescue won numerous awards, including the People's Choice Award at Toronto International Film Festival, and was also shortlisted for an Academy Award. Chin and Vasarhelyi are currently working on their first scripted feature, Nyad, starring Annette Bening and Jodie Foster about Diana Nyad's historic swim from Cuba to Florida.

Climbing career

From 1999 to 2001, Chin organized climbing expeditions to Pakistan's Karakoram Mountains. He signed a sponsorship agreement with The North Face in 2001.

In 2002, he was asked to join a National Geographic expedition to make an unsupported crossing of the remote Chang Tang Plateau in Tibet with Galen Rowell, Rick Ridgeway and Conrad Anker. The expedition was featured in National Geographics April 2003 issue and documented in Rick Ridgeway's book The Big Open.

In 2003, Chin headed to Everest with Stephen Koch. They attempted the direct North Face via the Japanese Couloir to the Hornbein Couloir in alpine style (eschewing supplemental oxygen, fixed ropes, and camps). They were unsuccessful and both were nearly killed in an avalanche.

In May 2004, Chin climbed Everest with David Breashears and Ed Viesturs while filming for Working Title on a feature film project with Stephen Daldry. Chin later accompanied Ed Viesturs to Annapurna in 2005. Viesturs successfully climbed Annapurna and finished his quest to climb all of the world's 8000-metre peaks without oxygen. Chin photographed the expedition and the story was featured in the September 2005 issue of Men's Journal.

In October 2006, he achieved the first successful American ski descent of Mount Everest with Kit DesLauriers and Rob DesLauriers. They skied from the summit and are the only people to have skied the South Pillar Route on the Lhotse Face.

In May 2007, Chin joined the Altitude Everest Expedition as a climber and expedition photographer in an attempt to retrace George Mallory and Sandy Irvine's fateful last journey up the North Face of Everest.

In 2007, Chin ventured to Borneo with Mark Synnott, Conrad Anker, and Alex Honnold to make the first ascent of a 2,500-foot overhanging alpine big wall at an elevation of 14,000 feet on Mount Kinabalu.

In 2008, Chin, Conrad Anker, and Renan Ozturk made their first attempt on the "Shark's Fin", a 1,500-foot blade of granite leading to the summit of 21,000-foot Meru Central, in India's Garhwal Himalaya range. They spend 19 days on the wall but are forced to turn back just 100 meters short of the summit.

In 2009, on an expedition to Chad's remote Ennedi Desert, Chin, Alex Honnold, Renan Ozturk, Mark Synott, and James Pearson made numerous first ascents of sandstone towers and arches.

Outside of major Himalayan expeditions, Chin has participated in numerous exploratory climbing and skiing expeditions to Baffin Island, Borneo, Mali, Chad, the Pitcairn Islands, Antarctica, and other remote regions of the planet.

In April 2011, Chin survived a class-4 avalanche in the Grand Tetons, his home mountain range.

In October 2011 Chin, Conrad Anker and Renan Ozturk made the first ascent of the Shark's Fin route on Meru Central in the Garhwal Himalayas in India. They had tried the same climb in 2008, but were forced to turn around 100m from the summit. His film of the climb, Meru, was released in theaters in 2015.

In 2017, Chin and Anker established a new route on Ulvetanna Peak, called The Wolf's Fang, in Queen Maud Land, in Antarctica.

In 2020, Chin, Anker, Jim Morrison, and Hilaree Nelson climbed and skied Mount Vinson, the highest peak in Antarctica, in a one-day push. The team spent less than 48 hours at the mountain. They went on to attempt to climb and ski the French Route on Mount Tyree, the second-highest peak in Antarctica but turned around due to high avalanche danger.

Filmmaking career
Chin began filming in 2003 under the mentorship of Rick Ridgeway. He was a cinematographer for the National Geographic television special Deadly Fashion. He later worked with David Breashears, shooting Ed Viesturs climbing to the summit of Mount Everest. He worked as a cinematographer with Chris Malloy of Woodshed films on the feature documentary 180 South.

In 2010, Chin started the commercial production company Camp 4 Collective with Tim Kemple and Renan Ozturk. He sold the company to his partners in 2014.

Chin collaborated with his wife Elizabeth Chai Vasarhelyi to produce and direct the feature-length documentary Meru, about his 2011 climb. It premiered at the 2015 Sundance Film Festival, winning the US Audience Documentary Award.

Alex Honnold and Chin started climbing together in 2009 but it was not until 2015 that Honnold chose Chin and wife Elizabeth Chai Vasarhelyi to film his process of climbing up El Capitan.

On June 3, 2017, Chin led a team that filmed Alex Honnold on the first ever rope-free ascent of El Capitan in Yosemite National Park. Collaborating again with Vasarhelyi, they produced and directed the feature-length documentary Free Solo. Free Solo went on to win the People's Choice Award: Documentaries at the 2018 Toronto International Film Festival, the 2018 BAFTA Award for Best Documentary, and the 2018 Academy Award for Best Documentary Feature.

Chin and Chai's 2021 documentary, The Rescue, chronicles the 2018 Tham Luang cave rescue, during which twelve boys belonging to an association football team and their assistant coach were rescued from inside a flooded cave in northern Thailand. The film, which premiered in select theaters in October 2021, won the People's Choice Documentary Award at the Toronto International Film Festival and received generally positive reviews.

The 8-part documentary series Edge of the Unknown with Jimmy Chin premiered on Disney Plus on September 7, 2022. Chin and Chai co-directed and produced 2 episodes, while Chin was featured throughout the series.

Philanthropy
Chin has worked with charities and campaigns supporting environmental rights. He has given master classes for the Rowell / International Campaign for Tibet to support Tibetan wildlife and culture. He has also partnered with the American Alpine Club to create an intentional resource for grieving. His work with The Access Fund supports national monument rights. Chin sits on the board of the National Outdoor Leadership School (NOLS) and a contributing member of the Conservation Alliance since 2001. Chin is also a member of the SeaLegacy ocean conservation project.

Personal life
Chin was born and raised in Mankato, Minnesota, and graduated from Wayland Academy. Both his parents are from China, his father was born in Wenzhou, and his mother was born in Harbin. They both worked as librarians.

He is a 1996 alumnus of Carleton College, where he received a BA in Asian Studies. He first became involved in climbing while at Carleton. After college, he became a climbing "dirtbag", despite his parents' disapproval. He serendipitously discovered photography when he borrowed his sleeping climbing partner's camera to take a photo. They sold the picture for $500, and this started his photography career.

On May 26, 2013, Chin married film director and producer Elizabeth Chai Vasarhelyi. They live in Jackson, Wyoming, with their daughter and son.

Notable ascents

Climbing
Meru-Sharks Fin, FA of East Face VII 5.10 A4 M7, India
Mt. Everest, South Col Route, Nepal
Ulvetanna, FA of the Anker Chin Route, VII 5.10, A3, Antarctica
Mt. Kinabalu, FA V 5.12 A2, Borneo
Kaga Pomori, FA IV; 5.11R South Face, Mali, Africa
Chiru Mustagh, first ascent Southeast Ridge, 21,000 ft., Xinjiang, China
Free solo of the Grand Traverse, Grand Teton National Park, 12 hours car to car
Tahir Tower, FA VII 5.11 A3, Kondus Valley, Karakoram, Pakistan
15 one day ascents of El Capitan
Native Son, VI 5.9 A4, Pacific Ocean Wall, VI 5.10, A3+
Beatrice Tower, FA VII 5.10+ A3+, Charakusa Valley, Karakoram, Pakistan
Fathi Brakk, FA VI 5.10+ A3 WI4, Charakusa Valley, Karakoram, Pakistan

Ski mountaineering
Mt. Everest, South Pillar Route, first American ski descent
Tai Yang Peak, first ascent and ski descent, Xinjiang, China
Chang Zheng Peak (22,800 ft.), first ski descent, Central Rongbuk, Tibet
25 ski descents of the Grand Teton
First solo winter ski descent of the Grand Teton
Skied the Grand Teton, Middle Teton and South Teton 10 hours car to car
Skied multiple lines off all the primary peaks in the Teton Range including the Newcomb Couloir on the north face of Buck Mountain, the Spooky Face on Nez Perce, the Amore Vida on the South Teton, the Glacier Route on the Middle Teton, the Colvin on Mount Owen, the East Face of Teewinot and the Skillet on Mount Moran among others.
Denali, West Buttress, Rescue Gully

Publications
There and Back (2021)

Filmography

Feature documentary producer / director
Meru (2015)
Free Solo (2018)
The Rescue (2021)
14 Peaks: Nothing Is Impossible (2021)
Wild Life (2023)

Instructor 

 MasterClass' Jimmy Chin Teaches Adventure Photography

Film awards and honors

Awards

Nominee Piolet D'Or International Climbing award
Outside Magazine's Adventurers of the Year 2012
American Society of Magazine Editors (ASME) Sports and Adventure Winner
Society of American Travel Writers (SATW) Foundation's Award
National Geographic and Microsoft Emerging Explorers Grant
Galen Rowell Memorial Photography Award
Lyman Spitzer Adventure Award: K7 Climbing Expedition
Polartec Grant Recipient: K7 Climbing Expedition
Honorary Doctorate, Sustainability Science, Unity College, Unity, Maine
Carleton College Alumni Award for Distinguished Achievement
National Geographic Photographer’s Photographer Award
National Geographic Further Award (2020)
Murie Spirit of Conversation Award
Audience Award at Sundance Film Festival for Meru (2015)
Academy Award for Best Documentary Feature for Free Solo (2018)
GQ Man of the Year (2021)
Ken Burn’s American Heritage Prize

See also
List of Mount Everest summiters by number of times to the summit

References

External links

1970s births
American mountain climbers
American people of Chinese descent
American people of Taiwanese descent
Carleton College alumni
Directors of Best Documentary Feature Academy Award winners
Living people
National Geographic photographers
People from Wilson, Wyoming
Primetime Emmy Award winners
Sportspeople from Mankato, Minnesota
American summiters of Mount Everest
Wayland Academy, Wisconsin alumni